A battle of bands is a musical contest of several bands.

It may also refer to:

 Battle of Bands, a 10th-century battle in Scotland
 Battle of the Bands (video game), a video game for the Nintendo Wii
 Battle of the Bands (book), a spin-off novel based upon the High School Musical franchise
 Battle of the Bands (TV movie), a Naked Brothers made-for-TV movie
 The Turtles Present the Battle of the Bands, an album by The Turtles